Red Sky may refer to:
Red Sky (EP), an EP by Thrice
"Red Skies", a song by the Fixx from Shuttered Room
"Red Sky" (song), a song by Status Quo from In the Army Now
Red Sky (2011 film), a 2011 Greek film
Red Sky (2014 film), an action film directed by Mario Van Peebles
"Red Sky" (Stargate SG-1), an episode of Stargate SG-1
Red Sky Music Festival, a music festival in Omaha, Nebraska, USA
"Red Sky", an episode of V
Red Skies, a novel by Jenny Oldfield
 Red Sky (Ralph McTell album), 2000
 Red Sky (Moon Hooch album), 2016

See also
Red Skye Comics, an American comic book line
Diffuse sky radiation
Red sky at morning (disambiguation)
Red sky at night (disambiguation)